Lachlan Hamish Munro (born 27 November 1986) is a New Zealand professional rugby union player. Munro is a versatile player and he is capable of covering every position in the backline.

Munro attended Auckland Grammar School.  In 2007 Munro played for the New Zealand 7s side and also the New Zealand under 21s side. He also played for Auckland in the National Provincial Championship. 2008, Munro moved north and notably played for the Northland union.

Munro was the leading points scorer for the 2010 ITM Cup with 172 points from 6 tries, 32 conversions and 26 penalties in 13 matches.
Munro appeared for the Blues in the 2009 and 2010 Super 14, travelling directly to many games despite not being selected in the initial Blues squads. Munro debuted against the Sharks in 2009. Munro was selected for the Blues full squad for the first time for 2011, and remained a squad member in 2012.

He then left New Zealand to join French Top 14 team CA Bordeaux-Bègles Gironde for the 2012–13 season where he played a few games. He decided to move to Pro D2 team LOU Rugby for the 2013–2014 season, where he was the team's main goal kicker.

For the 2015–2016 season, Munro joined French Rugby Pro D2 team Béziers. He joined Provence Rugby in 2018.

External links
 
Blues Profile
Auckland Rugby Union – Lachie Munro

1986 births
People educated at Auckland Grammar School
Living people
New Zealand rugby union players
Rugby union players from Auckland
Auckland rugby union players
Blues (Super Rugby) players
Northland rugby union players
Lyon OU players
Union Bordeaux Bègles players
AS Béziers Hérault players
Rugby union fullbacks
New Zealand expatriate rugby union players
New Zealand expatriate sportspeople in France
Expatriate rugby union players in France